Southend/Hans Ulricksen Field Aerodrome  is located  west-northwest of Southend, Saskatchewan, Canada. The airport, which was formerly operated by H. Ulricksen, was closed, then reopened in 2016.

See also 
 List of airports in Saskatchewan
 Southend Water Aerodrome

References

Registered aerodromes in Saskatchewan